The 2015–16 season was Ludogorets Razgrad's fifth season in A Football Group. They successfully defended their title, winning the championship for a fifth consecutive and overall time. However,  Ludogorets Razgrad lost the second round in the Bulgarian Cup, lost the SuperCup final and failed to qualify in the UEFA Champions League groups, losing in both legs of the second qualifying round to Milsami Orhei.

Squad

Transfers

Summer

In:

Out:

Winter

In:

Out:

}

Friendlies

Competitions

Bulgarian Supercup

A Football Group

League table

Results summary

Results by round

Results

Bulgarian Cup

Champions League

Qualifying phase

Squad statistics

Appearances and goals

|-
|colspan="14"|Players away from the club on loan:
|-
|colspan="14"|Players who appeared for Ludogorets Razgrad that left during the season:

|}

Goal Scorers

Disciplinary record

Notes 

On 16 December 2015, Litex Lovech were expelled from the league after their players left the field in protest over referee decisions in a match against Levski Sofia on 12 December 2015. On 20 January 2016 it was announced that Litex Lovech would be relegated to B Group All results from played matches involving Litex Lovech were annulled on 22 January 2016.

References

Ludogorets Razgrad
PFC Ludogorets Razgrad seasons
Ludogorets Razgrad
Bulgarian football championship-winning seasons